Rebecca N. Farmer Evans (born July 26, 1961) is a Georgia state representative from Atlanta, Georgia. A member of the Democratic Party, she defeated Democratic Party incumbent Howard Mosby, in November 2018.

Early life and career
Evans was born in Dallas, Texas. She holds a Bachelor's degree from Emory University. Evans lives in Atlanta, Georgia, with her husband David.

Political career
Evans was elected to the Georgia House of Representatives in 2018.

References

External links
 Official website

Living people
21st-century American politicians
21st-century American women politicians
Democratic Party members of the Georgia House of Representatives
Women state legislators in Georgia (U.S. state)
Politicians from Atlanta
Emory University alumni
Politicians from Dallas
1961 births